William Miller is a British sound engineer. He was nominated for an Academy Award in the category Best Sound for the film News of the World.

Selected filmography 
 News of the World (2020; co-nominated with Oliver Tarney, Mike Prestwood Smith and John Pritchett)

References

External links 

Living people
Place of birth missing (living people)
Year of birth missing (living people)
British audio engineers
21st-century British engineers